Pteroxanium kelloggi is a species of bark louse in the Lepidopsocidae family of the order Psocoptera. It can be found in France, Great Britain, Ireland, and Madeira. It is brownish-orange with white spots and is similar to Cerobasis guestfalica.

Habitat 
The species feed on ash, cedar, gorse, ivy, larch, oak,  pine, and yew. They also feed on plants such as rhododendrons. They can also be found on decayed fence-posts, foxglove seed-heads, under logs, and leaf litter.

References 

Stenopsocidae
Insects described in 1905
Psocoptera of Europe